Doderotrechus is a genus of beetles in the family Carabidae, containing the following species:

 Doderotrechus casalei Vigna Taglianti, 1969
 Doderotrechus crissolensis Dodero, 1924
 Doderotrechus ghilianii Fairmaire, 1859
 Doderotrechus obsoletus Agazzi, 1970

References

Trechinae